The  Eastern League season began on approximately April 1 and the regular season ended on approximately September 1. 

The Bristol Red Sox defeated the Glens Falls White Sox three games to two to win the Eastern League Championship Series.

Regular season

Standings

Notes:
Green shade indicates that team advanced to the playoffs
Bold indicates that team advanced to ELCS
Italics indicates that team won ELCS

Playoffs

Semi-finals Series
Bristol Red Sox defeated Reading Phillies 2 games to 0.

Championship Series
Bristol Red Sox defeated Glens Falls White Sox 3 games to 2.

Attendance

References

External links
1981 Eastern League Review at thebaseballcube.com

Eastern League seasons